Qazaxlı (also, Gazakhly) is a village in the Samukh District of Azerbaijan.

References 

Populated places in Samukh District